Sovere is a comune (municipality) in the province of Bergamo in the Italian region of Lombardy, located about  northeast of Milan and about  northeast of Bergamo.

Sovere borders the following municipalities: Bossico, Cerete, Endine Gaiano, Gandino, Lovere, Pianico, Solto Collina.

References